Miss World 1966, the 16th edition of the Miss World pageant, was held on 17 November 1966 at the Lyceum Ballroom in London, UK. The winner was Reita Faria of India, first Asian delegate to win Miss World title. She was crowned by one of the judging panel, Lady Annabel Birley.

Results

Contestants

  – Graciela Guardone
  – Reina Patricia Hernandez
  – Dorothy Cooper
  – Mireille de Man
  – Marlucci Manvailler Rocha
  – Diane Coulter
  – Priscilla Martensyn
  – Amelia Galaz
  – Sonia Mora
  – Annoula Alvaliotou
  – Irene Poller Hansen
  – Jeanette Dotel Montes de Oca
  – Alejandra Vallejo Klaere
  – Marita Gellman
  – Michèle Boulé
  – Oumie Barry
  – Jutta Danske
  – Grace Valverde
  – Efi Fontini Ploumbi
  – Umblita Van Sluytman †
  – Anneke Geerts
  – Danira Miralda Buines
  – Auður Harðardóttir
  – Reita Faria
  – Helen McMahon
  – Segula Gohr
  – Gigliola Carbonara
  – Yvonne Walter
  – Harumi Kobayashi
  – Vera Jalil Khamis
  – Chung Eul-sun
  – Marlène Talih
  – Mariette Sophie Stephano
  – Merlyn Therese McKelvie
  – Monica Sunnura
  – María Cecilia González DuPree
  – Naima Naim
  – Heather Gettings
  – Birgit Andersen
  – Vivien Lee Austria
  – Johanna Maud Carter
  – Linda Haselhoef
  – Ingrid Anna Andersson
  – Janine Solliner
  – Feryelle Jalal
  – Diane DeFreitas
  – İnci Asena
  – Jennifer Lowe Summers
  – Denice Estelle Blair
  – Jeannette Kopp Arenas
  – Nikica Marinović

Notes

Debuts
 Bahamas, Dominican Republic, Guyana, Philippines and Yugoslavia competed in Miss World for the first time.

Returning countries
 Switzerland last competed in 1956.
 Norway last competed in 1960.
 India last competed in 1962.
 Chile and Mexico last competed in 1963.
 Aruba and Turkey last competed in 1964.

Nations not competing
 
 
  – María Estela Sáenz Calero
 
 
  - Was barred from participating from 1966-1979 due to the country's political situation. Became Zimbabwe in 1980 and debuted as Zimbabwe at Miss World.
  – Paquita Torres Pérez (withdrew because Miss Gibraltar was in pageant)
  – Susana Regeden

Disqualified
  – Uzor Okafor (Was not nationally crowned; married with children)

References

External links
 Miss World official website
 Pageantopolis – Miss World 1966

Miss World
1966 in London
1966 beauty pageants
Beauty pageants in the United Kingdom
November 1966 events in the United Kingdom